This is a list of years in Lithuania.

20th century

21st century 

 
Lithuania history-related lists
Lithuania